The Tenth Cabinet of Rashid Karami was the fifty-sixth cabinet of Lebanon, the second under President Amine Gemayel and the tenth headed by Prime Minister Rashid Karami. It was a national unity coalition and formed on 13 April 1984. President Gemayel asked Karami to form the cabinet although Karami had not been active in politics for four years. The mission of the government was to terminate the civil war in the country which had begun in 1975.

On 4 May 1987 Rashid Karami resigned from the office due to harsh criticism of Samir Geagea who was the head of the Lebanese Forces. His resignation was neither accepted nor rejected by President Gemayel, and Karami assumed the role of caretaker prime minister until his assassination in June 1987. Following this incident Selim Hoss became the acting prime minister and served in the post until September 1988.

Composition
The cabinet members were as follows:

References

1984 establishments in Lebanon
Cabinets of Lebanon
Cabinets established in 1984
Cabinets disestablished in 1988
1988 disestablishments in Lebanon